Gates Center is a hamlet within the town of Gates in Monroe County, New York,  United States. It occupies the southern part of the census-designated place (CDP) of Gates. The ZIP code for the community is 14624.

Geography
The center of the hamlet is on NY 33 and Howard Road, west and south of Interstate 490.

Education
The hamlet of Gates Center is served by Gates-Chili Central School District.

References

External links
Gates Center map from Hometown Locator

Hamlets in New York (state)
Rochester metropolitan area, New York
Hamlets in Monroe County, New York